Sør-Varanger is a municipality in Troms og Finnmark county, Norway. The administrative centre of the municipality is the town of Kirkenes. Other settlements in the municipality include the villages of Bjørnevatn, Bugøynes, Elvenes, Grense Jakobselv, Hesseng, Jakobsnes, Neiden, and Sandnes. Located west of the Norway–Russia border, Sør-Varanger is the only Norwegian municipality that shares a land border with Russia, with the only legal border crossing at Storskog.

The  municipality is the 6th largest by area out of the 356 municipalities in Norway. Sør-Varanger is the 112th most populous municipality in Norway with a population of 9,925.

Name
The meaning of the name Sør-Varanger comes from the name of the large Varangerfjorden (Old Norse: Ver(j)angr) on the northern shore of the municipality. The first part is ver meaning "fishing village" and the last part is angr which means "fjord". It was first probably used for the narrow fjord on the inside of Angsnes which now is called "Meskfjorden" and leads into Varangerbotn. Sør means "south" in Norwegian. Prior to 1918, the name was spelled Sydvaranger (also meaning "South Varanger"). Before 1964, there also was a municipality named Nord-Varanger, located north of the Varangerfjorden, covering most of present-day Vadsø municipality.

History
Prehistoric labyrinth constructions at Holmengrå, were possibly used for religious purposes.

The original inhabitants of the area are the Skolt Sami. This Sami group migrated between coast and inland in present Norwegian, Finnish, and Russian territory long before any borders existed. In the 16th century, they were converted to the Russian Orthodox faith, and still today the chapel of Saint George at Neiden, dating from 1565, is a reminder of eastern influence.

Sør-Varanger became Norwegian in 1826, after having been [part of] a Russian-Norwegian fellesdistrikt - a district shared between two countries - that had a small Eastern Sami population group that was under Russian jurisdiction.
In 1826, the previously disputed areas were divided between Norway and Russia, causing great difficulties for the Sami. The Norwegian state also invited Norwegian settlers to come to the area, building Lutheran churches to counterbalance the Orthodox heritage, notably the King Oscar II Chapel, located immediately west of the Russian border. The historic border crossing station was at Skafferhullet (which was replaced with the present day station at Storskog).

The King Oscar II Chapel in Grense Jakobselv on the Russian border was built in 1869 to mark the border.

During the 19th century, Finnish settlers (Kven) arrived to the valleys, and since 1906, Norwegians came in large numbers because of the iron mining starting up near Kirkenes. After the Treaty of Tartu the area of Petsamo was ceded to Finland, and Sør-Varanger (and Norway) no longer bordered Russia, until Finland had to cede it back to the Soviet Union in 1944.

In 1906, the Sydvaranger company opened the Bjørnevatn Mine at Bjørnevatn and four years later the mine was connected to the port in Kirkenes by Kirkenes–Bjørnevatn Line, the world's most northern railway. The mine was closed in 1996, but re-opened in 2009.

In October 1944, Soviet forces chased Nazi-Germany's forces out of the municipality; some inhabitants were living in tunnels (outside Kirkenes) used for the mining industry, when the Soviet forces arrived; at the time Kirkenes was under intense bombing from aircraft.

In a 1944 report to Norway's prime minister in exile, a Norwegian government official (embedsmann ) in Finnmark—Thore Boye—said that Norwegian soldiers had [crop-] cut (snauklippet) "25 young girls—some of them married" who had been pointed out by local men, as having had relations with German soldiers".

Establishment of municipality
The municipality of Sør-Varanger was established on 1 July 1858 when the southern district of the municipality of Vadsø (population: 1,171) was separated to form the new municipality. The borders of the municipality have not changed since that time.

Coat of arms
The coat of arms was granted on 16 April 1982. The official blazon is "Per bend rayonny Or and gules". This means the arms have a field (background) with a diagonal line in the shape of flames. Above the line, the field has a tincture of Or which means it is commonly colored yellow, but if it is made out of metal, then gold is used. Below the line, the field has a tincture of gules (red). The arms show three flames along the division of the field. The division of the shield symbolizes the importance of the number three: The three main sources of income are agriculture, mining, and fishing; the municipality also has three main rivers (Neiden, Pasvikelva, and Jakobselva) that form the borders of Norway, Russia, and Finland; and there are three cultures in the municipality: Norwegians, Finns, and Sami. The arms were designed by Sissel Sildnes.

Geography

Most of the area is low-lying forest of pine and birch, with barren sections facing the Barents Sea.

The Varangerfjorden runs along the northern part of the municipality and the Bøkfjorden runs north–south cutting into the municipality and flowing into the Varangerfjorden. The large island of Skogerøya lies on the west side of the Bøkfjorden. Skogerøytoppen is the tallest mountain on Skogerøya. The Bøkfjord Lighthouse lies along the mouth of the Bøkfjorden.

The municipal centre of Sør-Varanger is the town of Kirkenes, located on a peninsula in the Bøkfjorden. Other settlements include Bugøynes, Neiden, and little hamlets along the river of Pasvikelva. The local airport is called Kirkenes Airport, Høybuktmoen which is also a military camp. The Garrison of Sør-Varanger (GSV) is based at Høybuktmoen.

The flora of the area is a part of the Russian and Siberian taiga, including a few hundred spruce trees of the Russian variety. Bears also inhabit the upper valley, notably in the Øvre Pasvik National Park, Øvre Pasvik Landscape Protection Area, and Pasvik Nature Reserve.

Lakes include Ellenvatnet, Gardsjøen, Garsjøen, Klistervatnet, and Ødevatnet. The fjords include Korsfjorden.

Climate
Sør-Varanger has a boreal climate (subarctic) with long, cold winters. Summers are short, but can sometimes see warm temperatures.

Economy

The service sector is one of the two most important industries related to the city of Kirkenes. Kimek, a company for repair of boats and ships, has 80 employees; the company is one of the largest employers in the municipality - alongside the municipality itself.

As of 2013, 2.8% of the work force in Sør-Varanger are employed in the primary sector.

Cruise ships have in 2022, stopped using the port at Kirkenes; ship owners consider the port to be too close to the [Russian border or] Russia; in 2022 the war between Russia and Ukraine escalated.

The mining company Sydvaranger went bankrupt in 2015 and its mining operations in the municipality does not have a timeframe for a restart (as of 2022), however there are 30 employees preparing for a possible restart; the company was acquired by Tacora Resources Inc (an American corporation) in 2021.

Government
All municipalities in Norway, including Sør-Varanger, are responsible for primary education (through 10th grade), outpatient health services, senior citizen services, unemployment and other social services, zoning, economic development, and municipal roads. The municipality is governed by a municipal council of elected representatives, which in turn elect a mayor.  The municipality falls under the Øst-Finnmark District Court and the Hålogaland Court of Appeal.

Municipal council
The municipal council of Sør-Varanger is made up of 27 representatives that are elected to four year terms. The party breakdown of the council is as follows:

Mayors
The mayors of Sør-Varanger:

1858-1860: Hans Kirkgaard 
1861-1864: Christian Taftezon  
1865-1868: Hans Figenschau 
1869-1872: Johannes Belsheim 
1873-1886: Anders Tokle 
1887-1890: Edvard Bakken  
1891-1894: Anders Tokle (V)
1895-1900: Emil Stang Lund (H)
1900-1904: Johannes Haaheim (V)
1905-1910: Andreas Bredal Wessel (Ap)
1911-1916: Mads Le Maire (LL)
1917-1919: Andreas Bergerud (LL)
1920-1922: Johan Hølvold (Ap)
1923-1925: Bjarne Sårheim (V)
1926-1928: Johan Hølvold (Ap)
1929-1931: Axel Borgen (V)
1923-1937: Sigurd Dørum (V)
1938-1940: Sverre Dølvik (Ap)
1944-1945: Sverre Dølvik (Ap)
1946-1947: Gotfred Johan Hølvold (NKP)
1948-1955: Harry Klippenvåg (Ap)
1950-1955: Hilmar Isaksen (Ap)
1956-1962: William Mikkelsen (Ap)
1962-1980: Arnt Isaksen (Ap)
1980-1982: Alfon Jerijärvi (Ap)
1982-1989: Nils-Edvard Olsen (Ap)
1990-1991: Halvard Kvamsdal (Ap)
1991-2003: Alfon Jerijärvi (Ap)
2003-2007: Tone Hatle (H)
2007-2011: Linda Beate Randal (Ap)
2011-2015: Cecilie Hansen (Sp)
2015-2021: Rune Rafaelsen (Ap)
2021-present: Lena Norum Bergeng (Ap)

Transportation
Kirkenes Airport, Høybuktmoen is operated by the state-owned Avinor and serves as the main primary airport for eastern Finnmark county. In addition Widerøe uses the airport as a hub to regional airports throughout Finnmark.

The Kirkenes–Bjørnevatn Line is a  railway, until 2010 the world's northernmost, which runs between Kirkenes and Bjørnevatn;

The European route E6 highway has its northern endpoint in the town of Kirkenes. This highway heads west and then south to the rest of Norway. The European route E105 highway has its northern endpoint in the village of Hesseng, just south of Kirkenes. That highway heads south into Russia through the Storskog border crossing, the only legal public crossing on the Norway-Russia border.

Religion

Churches
The Church of Norway has one parish within the municipality of Sør-Varanger. It is part of the Varanger prosti (deanery) in the Diocese of Nord-Hålogaland.

Archaeology
In 2015 rock carvings, estimatedly dated to 4200–5200 B.C. were found at Tømmerneset on Gamneset, several kilometers outside Kirkenes. The carvings were discovered along an old path used by reindeers—between two crags—by an archaeologist traveling between existing excavation sites at Gamneset. (A planned oil terminal will expectedly shut out the general public, from the site of the carvings.)

Leisure
Popular leisure activities include salmon fishing in one of the numerous rivers, hunting for moose and grouse, and snowmobile driving. Many inhabitants also own and frequently use a cabin located in more remote parts of the municipality.

Notable people

 Kathrine Bugge (1877–1951) an educator, cultural worker and politician, brought up in Jarfjord
 John Savio (1902 in Bugøyfjord - 1938) an artist of Sami and Kven descent, made woodcuts
 Osvald Harjo (1910–1993) a resistance member in WWII and a prisoner in Soviet Gulag camps for over a decade
 Alfred Henningsen (1918 in Sør-Varanger – 2012) a military officer, spy and politician
 Gudmund Grytøyr (born 1920 in Sør-Varanger - 2001) a sailor, laborer in industry and forestry, a farmer and politician
 Annemarie Lorentzen (1921 in Sør-Varanger – 2008) a politician and Norwegian ambassador to Iceland 1978 to 1985
 Aino Hivand (born 1947 in Bugøyfjord) Norwegian-Sami visual artist and children's book writer
 Helga Pedersen (born 1973 in Sør-Varanger) a politician, former Minister and member of the Storting; brought up in Vestertana
 Pavel Zakharov (born 2001 in Sør-Varanger) a Russian college basketball player
 and

Gallery

See also
Rock art at an eponymous place in a different county

References

External links

Municipal fact sheet from Statistics Norway 
Weather information for Sør-Varanger 
Tourist information: www.visitkirkenes.no
Video of 2015 rock carvings find, Helleristningene i Varanger

 
Municipalities of Troms og Finnmark
1858 establishments in Norway